Vânia Cristina Martins (born 9 November 1980), simply known as Vânia, is a Brazilian former footballer who played as a forward and full back. She was a member of the Brazil women's national team.

Career
Vânia played for several Brazilian teams, of which highlights Portuguesa, São Paulo and Corinthians.

International career
Vânia represented Brazil at senior level in the 2010 International Tournament City of São Paulo, playing a match against Netherlands.

Controversy
From 2011 to 2016, Vânia made appearances for the Equatorial Guinea women's national team despite having no connection with the African nation. She attended the 2011 FIFA Women's World Cup and was champion of the 2012 African Women's Championship. She also played the 2015 CAF Women's Olympic Qualifying Tournament and ultimately the 2016 Africa Women Cup of Nations Qualifying. On October 5, 2017, she and other nine Brazilian footballers were declared by FIFA as ineligible to play for Equatorial Guinea.

References

External links

1980 births
Living people
Footballers from São Paulo (state)
Brazilian women's footballers
Women's association football fullbacks
Women's association football forwards
Associação Desportiva Centro Olímpico players
Sport Club Corinthians Paulista (women) players
Levante UD Femenino players
Santa Teresa CD players
Incheon Hyundai Steel Red Angels WFC players
Primera División (women) players
Brazil women's international footballers
Brazilian expatriate women's footballers
Brazilian expatriate sportspeople in Spain
Expatriate women's footballers in Spain
Brazilian expatriate sportspeople in South Korea
Expatriate women's footballers in South Korea
Equatorial Guinea women's international footballers
2011 FIFA Women's World Cup players
Dual internationalists (women's football)
CD Badajoz Femenino players